Helicin is the O-glucoside of salicylaldehyde.

References 

Phenol glucosides
Benzaldehydes